Yūmi Nagashima (Japanese: 永島 優美, born November 23, 1991) is a Japanese announcer for Fuji TV.

Life and career 
Nagashima was born on November 23, 1991 in Hyogo Prefecture, Japan. Her father is Akihiro Nagashima, a former Japan national team soccer player and sports caster. Her mother gave her the name "Yūmi" because she was a big fan of Yumi Matsutoya (called Yūmin among her fans). She has a younger brother. On January 17, 1995, the Great Hanshin earthquake that occurred when she was three years old, completely destroyed her paternal grandparents' house. Announcer Chisa Takeda was her junior in elementary school.

She graduated from Kwansei Gakuin University after studying in the Faculty of Sociology. She belonged to the cheerleading club while in high school. On August 9, 2010, she was elected the first Kobe Wedding Queen. She also won the Grand Prix of Miss Campus of Kwansei Gakuin in 2011. From 2012 to 2013, she was a news reporter for "Ohayo Asahi Doyobi desu" (Good morning Asahi, it is Saturday) on Asahi Broadcasting while she was a university student.

After the announcer examination, she was appointed to TV Asahi and Fuji TV, and joined Fuji TV in April 2014. Announcer Masato Omura joined the company at the same time. In April 2016, she became the 7th female main caster of Mezamashi TV.

On March 3, 2021, she married a man one year older than her, who worked for the Fuji Television Network Information Production Bureau. She announced her marriage live on Mezamashi TV the next day.

On March 29, 2021, she was appointed as the main caster of Mezamashi 8 along with Shōsuke Tanihara. She left Mezamashi TV, where she has been the female main caster for five years since 2016.

See also 

 Akihiro Nagashima
 Mezamashi TV
 Fuji TV

References 

1991 births
Living people
Japanese announcers